Voltron: Fleet of Doom is a television special involving heroes of both Voltron series working together to defeat their sworn enemy, King Zarkon, who aligns with the remnants of Emperor Zeppo's Drule Empire to create a mighty armada called the Fleet of Doom.

This movie was released later on DVD by the company originally responsible for taking the Japanese source material and bringing it to American audiences, World Events Productions (WEP).

Plot
In his attempt to destroy the Galaxy Alliance, King Zarkon allies himself with Viceroy Throk of the Drule Supreme Council to create a mighty armada known as the Fleet of Doom. To stop Zarkon and his allies, the heroes of both Voltron series must join forces to stop them before they can destroy the Alliance. But when Princess Allura is captured by Witch Haggar, Keith sets out to rescue her so that they can rejoin their friends in time to stop the Fleet of Doom from destroying the secret power base of the Galaxy Alliance.

Cast
Peter Cullen – Commander Hawkins, Coran, King Alfor, Narrator, Viceroy Throk, Hutch
Michael Bell – Lance, Krik, Shannon, Marvin, Modok, Wolo 
Lennie Weinrib – Hunk, Prince Lotor, Cliff, Rocky
Neil Ross –  Keith, Jeff, Pidge, Chip
B.J. Ward – Princess Allura, Haggar, Cinda, Ginger, Lisa
Jack Angel – King Zarkon, Cossack

Home video releases and availability
The animated special Fleet of Doom has become a collector’s ambition, only further sought out because WEP has not included it in any of the Voltron DVD box sets it has released.

Fleet of Doom was released by WEP as an online exclusive and later was updated to have better DVD compatibility as there were many complaints about using the menu with older DVD players and that the editing was extremely poor with very long timeouts between the commercial breaks; additional trailers were also included. This updated version was made available by WEP on Amazon.com and is also still available on the Voltron store. Media Blasters released the special as a general release on July 28, 2009. This version was not part of the Voltron DVD box sets but as a stand-alone title.

In late 2010, Media Blasters announced a Blu-ray Disc release of Fleet of Doom, only to cancel it in early 2011. Nevertheless, copies of this Blu-ray edition began to become available in various internet shops as of September 2011, and it was eventually determined that these copies were genuine. However, it is unknown if an official release of this Blu-ray is planned.

References

External links
 

1986 television films
1986 films
Adventure anime and manga
American television films
Mecha anime and manga
Voltron